Oracle Internet Directory (OID) is a directory service produced by Oracle Corporation, which functions compatible with LDAP version 3.

Functionality 

OID makes the following features available from within an Oracle database environment:

 integration with Oracle 8i and subsequent databases for ease of use and administration
 a scalable, multi-platform listing structure for reliable and safe intranet integration
 synchronization of OID-based listings (also with distributed applications)
 integration of existing public key certificates, digital wallets (e-wallets) and entrance privileges
 co-existence with other LDAP implementations via Oracle's Directory Integration Platform (DIP)
 administration tools, including:
 routing policies
 system management objects such as Oracle Directory Manager (also known as "oidadmin" or "ODM")
 technical support regarding the quality of the services
 delegated administrative service

Implementation 

OID uses standard Oracle database structures to store its internal tables.

In Oracle version 9 databases, by default, many Oracle LDAP Table Stores use tablespaces with names beginning with the OLTS_ (and occasionally P1TS_) prefixes. Relevant default schemas used may include ODS (for "Oracle directory server") and ODSCOMMON.

Operation 

The OID Control Utility (OIDCTL) serves as a command-line tool for starting and stopping the OID server. The OID Monitor process interprets and executes the OIDCTL commands.

Marketing 

In comparing Oracle Internet Directory with its competitors, Oracle Corporation stresses that it uses as its foundation an Oracle database; whereas many competing products (such as Oracle Directory Server Enterprise Edition and Novell eDirectory) do not rely on an enterprise-strength relational database, but instead on embedded database engines similar to Berkeley DB. Integration with the Oracle database makes many of the technologies available for Oracle database available for Oracle Internet Directory, and improvements that Oracle makes in the database space can instantly flow through to its LDAP implementation.

For marketing purposes, OID forms part of the Oracle Identity Management suite of Oracle Application Server.

Distribution 

Oracle database version 9 included OID bundled as an extra facility.  OID shipped with the Oracle Application Server version 10.

 Oracle Corporation makes the most recent version of OID available only as part of the  Identity Management-suite bundling of Oracle Application Server (10.1.4.0.1).

Oracle Internet Directory 11g forms part of Oracle directory services (ODS).

See also 
 List of LDAP software
 Oracle Identity Management
 Oracle Directory Server Enterprise Edition

References

Benchmarks  
 50 Million Users on Sparc T5
 10 Million Users on Exalogic
 500 Million Users on Exadata
 2 Billion Users

External links 

 Oracle Internet Directory product page 
 11g Doc 
 an installation guide

Directory services
Oracle software